Powerful: Energy for Everyone is a 2010 Canadian documentary that explores different sources of renewable energy.

David Chernushenko takes audiences on a global journey to discover different ways of achieving a more sustainable lifestyle. The film introduces audiences to communities, both small and large, that have managed to adapt their way of life and embrace renewable energy.

See also
The Fourth Revolution: Energy
Community solar farm
Community wind energy
RAPS
Wadebridge Renewable Energy Network

References

External links

2010 documentary films
2010 films
2010 in the environment
Canadian documentary films
Documentary films about alternative energy
2010s Canadian films